Poison is the debut studio album from American R&B/hip hop group Bell Biv DeVoe, released March 20, 1990 on MCA Records.

The album peaked at number five on the Billboard 200 chart. By April 1995, it was certified quadruple-platinum in sales by the RIAA, after sales exceeding 4,000,000 copies in the United States.

Release and reception

The album peaked at five on the U.S. Billboard 200 and reached the top spot on the R&B Albums chart. The album was certified platinum in May 1990, and reached quadruple-platinum status by April 1995.

Alex Henderson at AllMusic noted that the album "delivered some of New jack swing's most worthwhile material," and also gave the group credit for being one of "the form's more creative and imaginative figures."

Track listing

Production & Personnel

Tracks 1 & 6 Produced by Dr. Freeze; associate producer (track 1): Howie Hirsch.  Recorded by Jay Henry.  Mixed (and remixed) by Eric Sadler and Hank/Keith Shocklee; track 6 mixed by Dr. Freeze & Jay Henry.  All Instruments by Dr. Freeze.
Tracks 2, 3 & 7 Produced by Eric Sadler/Hank & Keith Shocklee.  Recorded & Mixed by Dan Wood, Jamie Staub, Kirk Yano, Nick Sansano & Rod Hui.  All Music arranged & performed by Hank Shocklee & Roney Hooks.
Track 4 Produced by Bell Biv Devoe & Carl Bourelly.  Music Arranged by Carl Bourelly; vocals arranged by Bell Biv Devoe.  Recorded by Barbara Milne; assisted by Karen Bohannon & Michael Allair.  Mixed by Bell Biv Devoe.  Kevin Johnson: Drums, Percussion; Carl Bourelly: Keyboards; Chris Floberg & Sherman Foole: Programming.
Track 5 Produced by Bell Biv Devoe & Peace Productions.  Recorded by Stephen P. Blazina.  Mixed by Bell Biv Devoe & Stephen P. Blazina.  All Instruments, Vocals and Arrangements by Bell Biv Devoe.
Tracks 8 & 9 Produced by Alton Stewart & Timmy Gatling.  Recorded & Mixed by Kurt Upper.  Drum Programming & Keyboards by Howie Hirsch & Timmy Gatling. Alto sax solo on track 9 by John Doheny.

Charts

Weekly charts

Year-end charts

Certifications

See also
List of number-one R&B albums of 1990 (U.S.)

Notes

External links
 
 Poison at Discogs

1990 debut albums
Bell Biv DeVoe albums
MCA Records albums